Henry Gunstone (born 19 July 1940) is a former Australian rules football and cricket player. He played thirteen games for the then South Melbourne Football Club in the Victorian Football League (VFL) and played eleven games in the Victorian Premier Cricket competition for the Richmond Cricket Club.

References

External links
 
 

Living people
1940 births
Sydney Swans players
Australian rules footballers from Victoria (Australia)